Lorenzo Faraone  is an Australian electrical and electronic engineer and professor and head of department at the University of Western Australia.

He was elected Fellow of the Australian Academy of Science in 2006 in recognition of his research in microelectronics, optoelectronics, micro-electro-mechanical systems (MEMS) and nanotechnology.

He was named Fellow of the Institute of Electrical and Electronics Engineers (IEEE) in 2015 for development of semiconductor optoelectronic materials and devices.

References 

Fellow Members of the IEEE
Living people
Australian electrical engineers
Fellows of the Australian Academy of Technological Sciences and Engineering
Year of birth missing (living people)
Fellows of the Australian Academy of Science